David Lee Adams (born May 15, 1987) is an American former professional baseball infielder. He played in Major League Baseball (MLB) for the New York Yankees in 2013.

Prior to playing professionally, Adams competed on travel teams and for Grandview Preparatory School in Boca Raton, Florida. He attended the University of Virginia, where he played college baseball for the Virginia Cavaliers.

Amateur career
Adams played in amateur baseball tournaments from a young age, winning the championship in a 12-and-under travel competition for a team representing Broward and Palm Beach counties, against a team representing California's Central Valley, at the Baseball Hall of Fame in Cooperstown, New York. Chris Volstad was a teammate.

Adams attended Grandview Preparatory School in Boca Raton, Florida. A second baseman for the school's baseball team, Adams batted .464 with 25 runs batted in (RBI) and 17 stolen bases as a sophomore. Major League Baseball scouts followed Grandview Prep to see Adams.

Adams committed to attend the University of Virginia, to play college baseball for the Virginia Cavaliers baseball team. Baseball America rated Adams as the second-best high school third baseman in the United States. The Detroit Tigers chose Adams in the 21st round of the 2005 Major League Baseball Draft, but, disappointed with where he was selected, he opted not to sign, instead enrolling at Virginia.

In his freshman year, Adams became the Cavaliers' regular starting second baseman. He had a .318 batting average with five home runs and 49 runs batted in (RBI), and was named a Freshman All-American by Baseball America and Louisville Slugger. As a sophomore, in 2007, he had a .372 batting average and a .454 on-base percentage, earning Second-Team All-Atlantic Coast Conference honors. In 2006, he played collegiate summer baseball with the Brewster Whitecaps of the Cape Cod Baseball League, and returned to the league in 2007 to play for the Falmouth Commodores.

Adams played for the Cavaliers for three years, starting each season at second base. In his three years, Adams had a .325 batting average, and placed in the all-time top ten for the Cavaliers with 226 hits, 142 runs batted in, and 102 walks. The Cavaliers reached the NCAA Division I baseball tournament in all of Adams' three years at Virginia.

Professional career

New York Yankees
Out of Virginia, the New York Yankees selected Adams in the third round (106th overall) of the 2008 Major League Baseball Draft. Adams signed and made his professional debut that year with the Class-A Short Season Staten Island Yankees.

Adams played for the Class-A Charleston RiverDogs and Class-A Advanced Tampa Yankees in 2009. He began the 2010 season with the Class-AA Trenton Thunder, but suffered an ankle injury. The injury was originally thought to be a sprain.

At the 2010 MLB trade deadline, the Yankees and Seattle Mariners almost completed a deal that would have sent Adams, Jesús Montero, and Zach McAllister to the Seattle Mariners for All-Star pitcher Cliff Lee. When the teams shared medical reports, the Mariners determined that Adams' ankle was broken, not sprained. As a result, they chose to trade Lee to the Texas Rangers in a package centered around Justin Smoak.

Still rehabilitating from his ankle injury, Adams played for Tampa and the Rookie-level Gulf Coast Yankees in 2011. He was put on the disabled list three times due to the ankle. Adams was added to the Yankees' 40 man roster after the 2011 season to protect him from the Rule 5 draft.

Adams spent the 2012 season with the Trenton Thunder of the Class-AA Eastern League, where he hit .306/.385/.450 over 383 plate appearances. He played in only 86 games, as he missed time due to back spasms. After the regular season, the Yankees assigned Adams to play in the Arizona Fall League, where he played second and third base.

On March 26, 2013, the Yankees released Adams to make space on the team's 40-man roster for new acquisition Vernon Wells. The Yankees re-signed him to a minor league contract three days later. After playing in 27 games for the Scranton/Wilkes-Barre RailRiders of the Class AAA International League, in which he batted .316, the Yankees purchased his contract on May 15, the first day he was eligible to be promoted to the majors. Adams made his major league debut on May 15, 2013 and got his first career hit. Adams became the first Yankee to make a major league debut on a birthday.

On May 16, 2013, Adams got his first career double and RBI. On May 20, 2013, Adams hit his first major league home run off Freddy García in a game against the Baltimore Orioles. He played in 35 games with a .190 average, 2 home runs, and 9 RBI until being demoted to Triple-A on July 8, 2013. Adams got promoted again from Triple-A on July 24, 2013 after Luis Cruz was put on the DL. He was sent down on July 28, 2013 to make room when Jayson Nix was activated off the disabled list. On August 5, 2013, with Derek Jeter going on the DL, Adams was recalled again from Triple-A Scranton/Wilkes-Barre. He was then optioned back to Triple-A on August 11, 2013 in exchange for pitcher Dellin Betances. On September 1, 2013, Adams was called up for a fourth time with the Yankees this season. After the season, Adams was non-tendered by the Yankees, making him a free agent.

2014–2017
On December 13, 2013, Adams signed a major league deal with the Cleveland Indians. He was placed on outright waivers on March 22, 2014. Adams was claimed off waivers by the Baltimore Orioles on March 22, 2014. He played 100 games in the minors for the Orioles AAA and AA minor league teams.
On February 11, 2015, Adams signed a minor league contract with the Miami Marlins, he played the entire year with the Marlins AA Affiliate. He played 57 games for the Aguilas del Zulia of the Venezuelan Professional Baseball League during the off season and on November 23, 2015, Adams signed a minor league contract with the Toronto Blue Jays that includes an invitation to spring training. Adams only played 68 games with the Buffalo Bisons. He became a free agent on November 7, 2016. In the off season he played 16 games for the Tigres de Aragua of the Venezuelan Professional Baseball League.

Coaching career
Adams became a coach for Gulf Coast Yankees in 2017, and served as their manager in 2018. In 2019, Adams was named the manager for Staten Island.

Personal life
Adams' father, Dale, coached David on his 12-and-under travel team, and at Grandview Prep.

References

External links

1987 births
Living people
Águilas del Zulia players
American expatriate baseball players in Venezuela
Baseball coaches from Florida
Baseball players from Florida
Bowie Baysox players
Brewster Whitecaps players
Charleston RiverDogs players
Falmouth Commodores players
Gulf Coast Yankees players
Jacksonville Suns players
Major League Baseball third basemen
Minor league baseball coaches
Minor league baseball managers
New York Yankees players
Norfolk Tides players
People from Margate, Florida
Scranton/Wilkes-Barre RailRiders players
Staten Island Yankees players
Tampa Yankees players
Trenton Thunder players
Virginia Cavaliers baseball players